Leopold Trebitsch Memorial Tournament was a chess competition organized by the family of Austrian silk manufacturer Leopold Trebitsch. Twenty tournaments were played in Vienna between 1907 and 1938.

Wealthy industrialist Leopold Trebitsch (1842–1906) was a lover of chess and a patron of chess competitions. His family advanced the considerable sum of 100,000 kronen to the Vienna Chess Club (Wiener Schachklub) to organize a series of tournaments. Since Trebitsch died one month before the start of the first tournament, the competitions were named in his memory. Six of the first nine events (1907–18) were won by Carl Schlechter, but his death in December 1918, along with the loss of the Club's Trebitsch fund in the aftermath of Austria's debacle in World War I, put a temporary halt to the tournament. In 1926, Leopold Trebitsch's son, Oskar, made more funds available, enabling eleven additional competitions to be held until 1938, when Germany's annexation of Austria ended the event.

Winners
{| class="sortable wikitable"
! # !!Year !! Winner
|-
| 1 || 1907 ||  / 
|-
| 2 || 1909/10 ||  / 
|-
| 3 || 1910/11 ||  / 
|-
| 4 || 1911/12 ||  / 
|-
| 5 || 1913 ||  / 
|-
| 6 || 1914 ||  / 
|-
| 7 || 1915 ||  / 
|-
| 8 || 1916/17 ||  / 
|-
| 9 || 1917/18 ||  / 
|-
| 10 || 1926 ||  
|-
| 11 || 1927 || 
|-
| 12 || 1928 ||    
|-
| 13 || 1929/30 ||   
|-
| 14 || 1931 ||  
|-
| 15 || 1932 || 
|-
| 16 || 1933 ||   
|-
| 17 || 1934/35 || 
|-
| 18 || 1935 ||    
|-
| 19 || 1936 || 
|-
| 20 || 1937/38 || 
|}

References 

Chess competitions
Chess in Austria
Sport in Vienna
1907 in chess
1907 establishments in Austria
1938 disestablishments in Austria
Chess memorial tournaments
Recurring events established in 1907
Recurring events disestablished in 1938